Toni Fruk (born 9 March 2001) is a Croatian footballer who plays as a midfielder for HNK Gorica, on loan from Fiorentina.

Career

In 2018, Fruk joined the youth academy of Belgian side Mouscron. Before the second half of 2018–19, he signed for Fiorentina in the Italian Serie A. In 2020, he was sent on loan to Croatian second division club Dubrava. In 2021, Fruk was sent on loan to Gorica (Croatia) in the Croatian top flight. On 17 July 2021, he debuted for Gorica (Croatia) during a 0-2 loss to Rijeka. On 26 September 2021, Fruk scored his first goal for Gorica (Croatia) during a 3-4 loss to Rijeka.

References

External links

 

Croatian footballers
Association football midfielders
Living people
2001 births
People from Našice
Expatriate footballers in Italy
Croatian expatriate sportspeople in Italy
Croatian Football League players
First Football League (Croatia) players
HNK Gorica players
ACF Fiorentina players
NK Dubrava players
Croatian expatriate sportspeople in Belgium
Croatian expatriate footballers
Expatriate footballers in Belgium
Croatia under-21 international footballers
Croatia youth international footballers